Brianne Ashleigh Tju (born June 14, 1998) is an American actress. She is known for her roles as Riley Marra in the MTV series Scream, Alex Portnoy in the Hulu series Light as a Feather, Alexa in 47 Meters Down: Uncaged, and Margot in I Know What You Did Last Summer.

Life and career
Tju was born and raised in Chino Hills, California. She graduated from Ruben S. Ayala High School and currently undergoes her studies at the California State University, Fullerton. She is the older sister of actress Haley Tju. She is of Chinese and Indonesian heritage.

In 2007, Tju made her television acting debut in the Disney Channel series Cory in the House. Following on from her first role, Tju won other roles on a variety of TV shows and films including Liv and Maddie, Pass the Light, Grey's Anatomy, A.P. Bio and 9-1-1.

In 2015, Tju starred in the recurring role of Riley Marra on the MTV slasher television series Scream.

On June 4, 2018, it was announced that Tju had been cast in the series regular role of Alex Portnoy on the Hulu series Light as a Feather.

Tju co-starred in the survival horror film 47 Meters Down: Uncaged, which was released in theaters on August 16, 2019.

Filmography

Film

Television

Awards and nominations

References

External links

 

Living people
1998 births
21st-century American actresses
American child actresses
American film actresses
American television actresses
American people of Indonesian descent
American people of Chinese descent
People from Chino Hills, California
Actresses from California
American actresses of Chinese descent